Robert Coates is the name of:

Robert Coates (actor) (1772–1848), British would-be-actor, famous for his atrocious skills
Robert Coates (cricketer) (1881–1956), New Zealand cricketer
Robert Coates (critic) (1897–1973), American art critic
Robert Coates (politician) (1928–2016), Canadian politician